Betula dahurica (lit. 'Daur birch'), Dahurian birch, or Asian black birch, is a species of  birch which is native to China, Japan, Korea, eastern Mongolia, and Russian Far East. It was introduced to the United Kingdom and also grows at the Arnold Arboretum in Boston. In Japan, it usually grows in Nobeyama in Nagano Prefecture in the island of Honshu where it is considered to be endangered. Small population of them can also be found on Hokkaido and Kuril Islands.

Description
The species also have an elliptic and hairless nutlet which have membranous wings. Flowers bloom from June to July while fruits are from July to August.

References

dahurica
Flora of China
Flora of Japan
Flora of Korea
Flora of Mongolia